The 2008 Victorian Football League (VFL) was a semi-professional Australian Rules Football competition featuring thirteen teams from Victoria and one team from Tasmania.

It was the 127th season of the Australian rules football competition. The premiership was won by the North Ballarat Football Club, who defeated Port Melbourne by 45 points in the Grand Final on 26 September. It was the first VFL premiership in North Ballarat's history.

League membership and affiliations
Prior to the 2008 season, there were several changes to the VFL-AFL reserves affiliations:
 ended its seven-year affiliation with Williamstown, and began fielding its own reserves team in the VFL, having previously done so in the 2000 season.
 ended its eight-year affiliation with Werribee, and entered a new affiliation with Williamstown.
 ended its two-year partial affiliation with Tasmania. Unlike many other VFL/AFL affiliations, which had strengthed their VFL clubs, the North Melbourne–Tasmania alignment had been very unpopular amongst Tasmanian fans, and significantly harmed the VFL club's standing within the state. North Melbourne's other partial affiliation with North Ballarat was unchanged.

As a result, the size of the VFL increased to fourteen teams: nine VFL-AFL affiliations, two AFL reserves teams and three stand-alone VFL clubs.

VFL-AFL alignments

VFL season

Ladder

Finals series

Season Awards

Best and Fairest
The VFL Best and Fairest is awarded the J. J. Liston Trophy.

Leading Goalkickers
The VFL Leading Goalkicker at the end of the regular season is awarded the Jim 'Frosty' Miller Medal.
The 2008 winner was Nick Sautner of the Sandringham Zebras.

Other
The Fothergill-Round Medal was won by Robin Nahas (Port Melbourne).
Williamstown won the reserves premiership. Williamstown 16.17 (113) defeated Box Hill 11.16 (82) in the Grand Final, held as a curtain-raiser to the Seniors First Preliminary Final on 20 September.

Notable events
The timing of the Grand Final was shifted to the Friday night immediately before the AFL Grand Final, after many years of having been played on the preceding Sunday, and also moved to a new venue at Telstra Dome. This shift in timing lasted only two seasons, before the game reverted to the Sunday before the AFL Grand Final.
Starting from this season, the TAC Cup Under 18s Grand Final was played as a curtain-raiser to the VFL Grand Final. The VFL Reserves Grand Final was shifted to the previous week, and was thereafter played as a curtain-raiser to one of the senior preliminary finals.

See also
 List of VFA/VFL premiers
 Australian Rules Football
 Victorian Football League
 Australian Football League
 2008 AFL season

References

External links
AFL Victoria website
Official VFL website
Unofficial VFL website

Victorian Football League seasons
VFL